Maryam Afifa Ansari (Hindi: मरियम अफीफा अंसारी, Urdu: مریم عفیفہ انصاری, Romanized: Maryam 'Afīfa Anṣāri) is an Indian neurosurgeon who is the first female Muslim neurosurgeon in India.

Education 
She secured 137th rank in the All India Neet SS exam.

She completed her MBBS from Osmania University & after that she pursued her post-graduation in General surgery from the same. She went on to train at the Royal College of Surgeons of England, and then passed the boards in India.

References 

Indian neurosurgeons
Living people
Place of birth missing (living people)
Osmania University alumni
Indian women surgeons
Women neurosurgeons
1995 births